Mauren (High Alemannic: Muura) is a municipality in Liechtenstein that is situated in the north of the country. It has a population of 4,401. The Curta mechanical calculator was produced by Contina AG, in Mauren.

History
During antiquity, a Roman road crossed what is known as Mauren.

It was first mentioned as "Muron" in documents from 1178. There is a memorial to the Liechtenstein educator and historian Peter Kaiser (1793–1864) located in Mauren.

Since 1905, Mauren has existed as a church community.

Notable people 

 Peter Kaiser (1793 in Mauren – 1864 in Chur) was a historian and statesman, known as a proponent of the rights of the common people or serfs in his home country
 Fritz Kaiser (born 1955 in Mauren) a wealth management entrepreneur, investor and philanthropist 
 Dominique Hasler (born 1978) a Liechtensteiner politician, Minister of Home Affairs, Education and Environment since 2017, she grew up in Mauren
 Jürgen Berginz (born in Mauren 1989) is a bobsledder who competed for Liechtenstein at the 2010 Winter Olympics

References

External links

Official website
Liechtenstein Portal

Municipalities of Liechtenstein
Austria–Liechtenstein border crossings